Mersey Spit is a spit on the south coast of King George Island, close north of Penguin Island, in the South Shetland Islands of Antarctica. It was charted and named during 1937 by Discovery Investigations personnel on the Discovery II.

References

Spits of Antarctica
Landforms of King George Island (South Shetland Islands)
Landforms of the South Shetland Islands